Reyranella is a genus of bacteria from the order Rhodospirillales.

References

Rhodospirillales
Bacteria families